Sir Alexander Cumming, 1st Baronet (c.1670–1725) of Culter, Aberdeen,  was a Scottish landowner and Tory politician who sat in the House of Commons from 1709 to 1722.

Cumming was the eldest son of Alexander Cumming of Culter and his wife Helen Allardice, daughter of James Allardice of Allardice, Kincardine. He married, in about 1690, Elizabeth Swinton, daughter of Sir Alexander Swinton, Lord Mersington, known as the fanatical judge,  and entered the faculty of advocates in 1691. He went to study  in Holland. He was created a Baronet in the Baronetage of Nova Scotia on 28 February 1695. He qualified at  Leyden on 30 December 1695, aged 25 and returned to Scotland and attracted prominent clients to his practice.  He was Commissioner of Justiciary for the Highlands in 1701 and 1703 and  captain of foot in the Earl of Mar’s regiment from 1702 to 1704. From 1705 to 1711 he was conservator of Scottish privileges in the Low Countries. His wife Elizabeth died in 1709 and he married as his second wife Elizabeth Dennis, daughter of William Dennis of Pucklechurch, Gloucestershire on 10 September 1710

Cumming was elected Member of Parliament for Aberdeenshire at a by-election on 18 January 1709. Initially he voted with the Administration on the naturalization of the Palatines, but as an Episcopalian moved to the Tories, and voted against the impeachment of Dr Sachaverell. He was elected again at the  1710 British general election and took part in attacks on the old ministry, being included in the list of ‘worthy patriots’ who had helped to detect their mismanagement. On a Scottish matter, he voted in February 1711 against  Mungo Graham  over the disputed Kinross-shire election, and became a member of an informal ‘steering committee’ of Scottish episcopalian MPs. He was returned again in  1713 and 1715. He did not stand in 1722.

Cumming died on 7 February 1725, in debt as a result of the South Sea Bubble. By his first wife he had a son and two daughters, and by his second wife a son (James Cumming of Breda) and five daughters. His son Alexander by his first wife succeeded him in the baronetcy.

External links
Geograph - Culter House

References

1670s births
1725 deaths
British MPs 1708–1710
British MPs 1710–1713
British MPs 1713–1715
British MPs 1715–1722
 
Members of the Parliament of Great Britain for Scottish constituencies
Baronets in the Baronetage of Nova Scotia